Crabro villosus is a species in the order Hymenoptera ("ants, bees, wasps and sawflies"), in the class Insecta ("insects").
It is found in North America.

References

Further reading
 Ross H. Arnett. (2000). American Insects: A Handbook of the Insects of America North of Mexico. CRC Press.

Crabronidae
Insects described in 1895